Namaqua may refer to:

 Nama people of southern Africa
 Namaqua rain frog (Breviceps namaquensis)
 Namaqua dove (Oena capensis)
 Namaqua chameleon (Chamaeleo namaquensis)
 Namaqua darkling beetles, species in the genus Cryptochile
 Namaqua National Park, national park in South Africa
 Namaqua plated lizard (Gerrhosaurus typicus), is a species of lizard
 Namaqua sandgrouse (Pterocles namaqua), is a species of ground-dwelling bird
 Fort Namaqua, was a trading post from 1858 or 1859, Loveland, Colorado 
 Herero and Namaqua genocide, campaign of ethnic extermination and collective punishment waged in German South West Africa (now Namibia)

See also
 Namaqualand, an arid region of Namibia and South Africa